Anca Verma (née Neacșu; born 8 August 1987) is the Romanian supermodel, businesswoman and wife of arms dealer Abhishek Verma.

Career
Verma graduated from the University of Galați with a master's degree in engineering. After leaving modelling, she joined Atlas Telecom Network Romania, a mobile service provider, and was appointed the Deputy general manager of Bucharest operations. Upon her marriage to Abhishek Verma in 2006, she became his lieutenant in his global weapons trade and defense supplies business; in 2011 she bought into 51% equity and was appointed the Managing Director of SIG Sauer India, a joint venture with the multinational weapons contractor.

Verma is the Chairperson of Olialia World a fast moving consumer goods multinational corporation. Verma was awarded the contract to construct & own Maldives International Airport with an investment of US$500 million. This airport would be known as 'Olialia International Airport' for 50 years. Close to the international airport in Maldives, Verma is developing another island into a five star hotel called the Olialia Island Resort.

Verma is involved in philanthropic activities in India and Romania. In March 2020 Verma donated millions of facemasks, sanitizers and medical supplies to hospitals in India to protect healthcare professionals and patients from Corona Virus flu.

Arrest and imprisonment
Verma and her husband have been accused of corruption and money laundering and were arrested by the CBI for supposedly bribing Indian defense officials to secure billion-dollar weapons contracts. On 8 June 2012 they were both imprisoned in Tihar Jail, Delhi. Verma was the inspiration for author Sunetra Choudhury who wrote a book Prison Tales published by Roli Books and featured Verma as the VIP inmate who wore 24K gold plated Louis Vuitton high heel shoes in prison.

Verma's bail plea was rejected by the Delhi High Court in March 2015, but on 20 May 2016 the court granted her bail after four years in prison.  According to Indian investigators, their attempts to freeze Verma's offshore bank accounts in the tax haven of Principality of Liechtenstein had been unsuccessful as the Liechtenstein government rejected the request from Enforcement Directorate India, calling it a 'fishing expedition' as no charges had been brought forward that could constitute a criminal offence in Liechtenstein or the European Union.

In April 2017, Verma was exonerated by Special court of CBI in New Delhi from all charges of corruption and moneylaundering and the two cases against Verma were dismissed.

References

Living people
1987 births
People from Galați
Romanian female models
Romanian women in business
Romanian emigrants to India
Romanian expatriates in India
Romanian people imprisoned abroad
Inmates of Tihar Jail
Prisoners and detainees of India
21st-century Romanian women